Al-Dimas, also known as Ad-Dimas, is a town in Syria, located west of the capital city of Damascus. According to the Syria Central Bureau of Statistics, the town had a population of 14,574 in the 2004 census.

Al-Dimas is the location where a Canadian peacekeeping aircraft crashed after being shot down by three Syrian surface-to-air missiles on August 9, 1974.

Climate
In Ad Dimas, there is a Mediterranean climate. Rainfall is higher in winter than in summer. The Köppen-Geiger climate classification is Csa. About  of precipitation falls annually.

References

Populated places in Qudsaya District
Towns in Syria